This was the first edition of the tournament.

Ričardas Berankis won the title, defeating Grega Žemlja 6–3, 6–4 in the final.

Seeds

Draw

Finals

Top half

Bottom half

References
Main Draw
Qualifying Draw

TAC Cup Nanjing Challenger - Singles